Dobre  is a village in Mińsk County, Masovian Voivodeship, in east-central Poland. It is the seat of the gmina (administrative district) called Gmina Dobre.

The village has a population of 1,627.

References

Dobre